North Imenti is an electoral constituency in Kenya. It is one of nine constituencies of Meru County. The constituency was established for the 1988 elections.

It was one of three constituencies of the former Meru Central District. Its headquarters are in Meru Town

Members of Parliament 

2013-2017 |[Abdul Rahim Dawood]
            |[Alliance Party of 
            Kenya (APKl]| |

2017-2022  |[Abdul Rahim Dawood]
           [Jubilee Party]

Wards

References 

Constituencies in Meru County
Constituencies in Eastern Province (Kenya)
1988 establishments in Kenya
Constituencies established in 1988